Christopher McKeown is a British Paralympic athlete. He won a bronze medal in the men's shot put L5 event at the 1984 Summer Paralympics.

References

External links 
 

Living people
Year of birth missing (living people)
Place of birth missing (living people)
Paralympic bronze medalists for Great Britain
Paralympic medalists in athletics (track and field)
Athletes (track and field) at the 1984 Summer Paralympics
Medalists at the 1984 Summer Paralympics
Paralympic athletes of Great Britain
British male shot putters